A watergate (or water gate) is a fortified gate, leading directly from a castle or town wall directly on to a quay, river side or harbour.  In medieval times it enabled people and supplies to reach the castle or fortification directly from the water, and equally allowed those within the castle direct access to water transport.

Examples

 Bristol Castle
 Newport Castle
 Southampton Castle
 The Traitors' Gate at the Tower of London

See also
Irrigation gate

References

Types of gates
Castle architecture
City walls